Gola may refer to:

Groups and tribes
Gola people, a tribal people and language in Liberia
Gola (community/surname), part of Kumhar community in North India.

Geography

Poland
Gola Dzierżoniowska in Lower Silesian Voivodeship (south-west Poland)
Gola, Lubin County in Lower Silesian Voivodeship (south-west Poland)
Gola, Trzebnica County in Lower Silesian Voivodeship (south-west Poland)
Gola, Łódź Voivodeship (central Poland)
Gola, Gostyń County in Greater Poland Voivodeship (west-central Poland)
Gola, Grodzisk Wielkopolski County in Greater Poland Voivodeship (west-central Poland)
Gola, Jarocin County in Greater Poland Voivodeship (west-central Poland)
Gola, Kępno County in Greater Poland Voivodeship (west-central Poland)
Gola, Krosno Odrzańskie County in Lubusz Voivodeship (west Poland)
Gola, Gmina Sława in Lubusz Voivodeship (west Poland)
Gola, Gmina Szlichtyngowa in Lubusz Voivodeship (west Poland)
Gola, Namysłów County in Opole Voivodeship (south-west Poland)
Gola, Olesno County in Opole Voivodeship (south-west Poland)

Elsewhere

Gola, Koprivnica-Križevci County, a town in Croatia
Gola (community development block), Jharkhand, India
Gola, Ramgarh, a village in Jharkhand, India
Gola Gokarannath, a city in Uttar Pradesh, India
 Gola River, Uttarakhand, India
Gola Island or Oileán Ghabhla, a small uninhabited island off the coast of County Donegal in Ireland
Gola, Nepal
Gola National Park, Sierra Leone

People
Tom Gola (1933–2014), American basketball player
Gölä (born 1968), Swiss rock musician
Gola, nickname for former Chelsea footballer Gianfranco Zola

Other
Gola (manufacturer), a British sporting goods manufacturer
Gola in Hebrew refers to the Jewish diaspora
Gola, a type of snow cone in Southern Asia,